The Nicholls Colonels college football team represents Nicholls State University in the Southland Conference. The Colonels compete as part of the National Collegiate Athletic Association (NCAA) Division I Football Championship (FCS). The program has had 10 head coaches since it began play during the 1972 season. Since November 2014, Tim Rebowe has served as Nicholls' head coach. Bill Clements is the leader in seasons coached with seven, and Sonny Jackson is both the leader in games won with 39 and winning percentage with .581. Charlie Stubbs has the lowest winning percentage of those who have coached more than one game, with .208.

Key

Coaches

Notes

References

Nicholls

Nicholls Colonels football coaches